Cremona (minor planet designation: 486 Cremona) is a minor planet orbiting the Sun.

References

External links 
 Lightcurve plot of 486 Cremona, Palmer Divide Observatory, B. D. Warner (2006)
 Asteroid Lightcurve Database (LCDB), query form (info )
 Dictionary of Minor Planet Names, Google books
 Asteroids and comets rotation curves, CdR – Observatoire de Genève, Raoul Behrend
 Discovery Circumstances: Numbered Minor Planets (1)-(5000) – Minor Planet Center
 
 

Background asteroids
Cremona
Cremona
19020511